Hage is a Samtgemeinde ("collective municipality") in the district of Aurich, in Lower Saxony, Germany. Its seat is in the municipality Hage.

The Samtgemeinde Hage consists of the following municipalities:

 Berumbur 
 Hage
 Hagermarsch 
 Halbemond 
 Lütetsburg

Samtgemeinden in Lower Saxony
Towns and villages in East Frisia